The Wacky Wabbit is a 1942 Merrie Melodies cartoon directed by Bob Clampett. It stars Bugs Bunny (Voice by Mel Blanc) and Elmer Fudd (voiced by Arthur Quirk Bryan).

Plot
Singing a modified version of "Oh! Susanna," Elmer Fudd trudges into the desert looking for gold to support the World War II Allied victory effort. An initially unseen creature - it is soon clear it is Bugs Bunny - pokes its eyes into the empty sockets of a bison skull. As Elmer passes, Bugs greets him; Elmer merely tips his hat in response and continues his trek. Bugs then falls into step with him, harmonizing on "Oh! Susanna". After a big finish to the song, Bugs does a flourish and disappears into a hole in the ground, leaving Elmer stunned that only the skull remains. As Elmer is checking out the hole and pondering the strangeness of the situation, Bugs - once again wearing the skull - walks up behind him and utters, "What's up, Doc?" Elmer starts to explain what is bothering him but is suddenly scared by the proximity of the skull. After running off in fear (with the paint inside his outline somehow coming out as he dashes off), he returns and says, "That's that scwewy wabbit." He shrugs this off and continues his search for gold.

With a pick axe, Elmer digs a hole and drops in a lit stick of dynamite. Bugs immediately throws it back out, then the two engage in a 'toss it in/throw it out' battle until Elmer uses a zipper to close the hole. He then runs off and shelters behind a cactus, awaiting the expected blast. Bugs approaches from behind Elmer, taps him on the rear, reveals he is holding the dynamite, and asks, "Did you lose this?" Elmer reaches for the stick then recoils, realizing what it is. He cowers against the cactus and Bugs stands with a finger in one ear. The dynamite fizzles out harmlessly, but Bugs shrieks "BAM!" places a roasting pan lid on Elmer's head and bashes it with a ladle, then runs away.

Elmer grabs his rifle and gives chase. Bugs intercepts him and begins excitedly declaring that gold has been discovered, then reveals it is a gold filling in one of his teeth. Elmer naïvely dismisses the amount as inconsequential, as he also has a gold filling, then begins to lose his temper. Bugs makes like a swimmer as he enters a hole; Elmer adopts a sweet tone, trying to coax the rabbit out. He prepares to 'greet' Bugs with the pick axe. But when he swings it over his shoulder, it sticks in the wall behind him. Elmer does not realize this has occurred. When Bugs pops up, he sees the failed tactic. Using scissors, Bugs cuts off Elmer's shirt and suspenders, revealing his yellow and red polka-dotted boxers and a girdle. Bugs wolf-whistles at Elmer's attire and ducks back into the hole. Elmer breaks the fourth wall and says to the audience watching the scene, "Don't waugh! I'll bet pwenty of you men would wear one of these!" After pulling his clothes back on he declares, "That's the wast stwaw." He dives into the hole as Bugs pops out of the ground beside it.

Bugs calls down asking Elmer where he is; we see Elmer's eyes, looking distressed, as he indicates he is at the bottom of the hole. "Too bad," Bugs says and proceeds to unapologetically bury Elmer ("Ain't I a stinker?"). Bugs ambles off but meets up with Elmer, who has dug himself out and is now livid. He is determined to get the gold he came for and now targets Bug's tooth. After a skirmish, Elmer emerges with a gold tooth in hand. When he smiles, it is clear the tooth is his own and it is also clear Bugs' tooth is still intact. Elmer remains oblivious, however, as the camera irises out with a glimmer.

Home media
VHS - Cartoon Moviestars: Elmer!, and Hollywood Cartoon Superstars - Volume 4 
Laserdisc - The Golden Age of Looney Tunes, Vol. 2, Side 5: Bob Clampett
DVD - Looney Tunes Golden Collection: Volume 5, Disc 3
Additionally, since the cartoon has fallen into the public domain, it can be found on various unauthorized VHS tapes and DVDs in varying quality.

Notes
A short clip from the cartoon can be seen in the opening credits of the Futurama episode "Love's Labour Lost in Space".
Much like "Wabbit Twouble" directed by Bob Clampett the previous year, this cartoon features Bugs as the aggressor provoking Elmer for no apparent reason.
Fat Elmer would wear a girdle with his underwear again in "Fresh Hare".
The Wacky Wabbit is one of the pre-1948 cartoons to fall into the public domain as United Artists, the copyright holder of the pre-1948 shorts at the time, failed to renew the copyright in time.
The cartoon with "Peck Up Your Troubles", and the reissues of "The Merry Old Soul", "Booby Hatched", "Tick Tock Tuckered", and "Trap Happy Porky" has a special 1941-1955 ending rendition of Merrily We Roll Along. Both American and European Turner "dubbed" version prints keep this original ending rendition.
Various clips of the short in a slightly-enhanced form are featured in the Thelma and Louise-inspired music video for On My Mind by the British singer Ellie Goulding.

See also
 List of films in the public domain in the United States

References

External links
 

1942 films
1942 short films
1942 animated films
1940s animated short films
Merrie Melodies short films
Films directed by Bob Clampett
Films about mining
Films scored by Carl Stalling
Bugs Bunny films
Films produced by Leon Schlesinger
1940s Warner Bros. animated short films